This is a list of team records for the Cincinnati Reds baseball team. The Reds do not recognize records set before 1900.

Single-season leaders (through 2014)

Batting
Average: Cy Seymour, .377 (1905)
On-base percentage: Joey Votto, .474 (2012)
Slugging Percentage: Kevin Mitchell, .681 (1994)
OPS: Kevin Mitchell, 1.110 (1994)
At Bats: Pete Rose, 680 (1973)
Runs: Frank Robinson, 134 (1962)
Hits: Pete Rose, 230 (1973)
Total Bases: George Foster, 388 (1977)
Doubles: Frank Robinson/Pete Rose, 51 (1962/1978)
Triples: 3 tied, 22 (multiple occasions)
Home Runs: George Foster, 52 (1977)
Runs batted in: George Foster, 149 (1977)
Walks: Joey Votto, 143 (2015)
Strikeouts: Drew Stubbs, 205 (2011)
Stolen Bases: Hugh Nicol, 138 (1887) (stolen bases were scored differently in the 19th century) - since 1900: Bob Bescher, 81 (1911)
Singles: Pete Rose, 181 (1973)
Runs Created: Frank Robinson, 158 (1962)
Extra-Base Hits: Frank Robinson, 92 (1962)
Times on Base: Joey Votto, 321 (2017)
Hit By Pitch: Shin-Soo Choo, 26 (2013)
Sacrifice Hits: Jake Daubert, 39 (1919)
Sacrifice Flies: Johnny Temple, 13 (1959)
Grounded into Double Plays: Ernie Lombardi, 30 (1938)
At Bats per Strikeout: Edd Roush, 75.2 (1931)
At Bats per Home Run: Kevin Mitchell, 10.3 (1994)
Outs: Woody Williams, 520 (1944)
Stolen Bases By A Rookie: Billy Hamilton, 56 (2014)

Pitching
Earned run average: Harry McCormick, 1.52 (1882)
Wins: Will White, 43 (1883)
Won-Loss %: Tom Seaver, .875 (1981)
Walks and hits per inning pitched: Tom Seaver, .956 (1977)
Hits Allowed/9IP: Mario Soto, 5.96 (1980)
Walks/9IP: Red Lucas, .737 (1933)
Strikeouts/9IP: Mario Soto, 9.57 (1982)
Games: Wayne Granger, 90 (1969)
Saves: Jeff Brantley, 44 (1996)
Innings: Will White, 577 (1883)
Strikeouts: Mario Soto, 274 (1982)
Games Started: Will White, 64 (1883)
Complete Games: Will White, 64 (1883)
Shutouts: Will White, 8 (1882)
Home Runs Allowed: Bronson Arroyo, 46 (2011)
Walks Allowed: Tony Mullane, 187 (1891)
Hits Allowed: Tony Mullane, 501 (1886)
Strikeout to Walk: Erik Hanson, 4.391 (1994)
Losses: Tony Mullane, 27 (1886)
Earned Runs Allowed: Tony Mullane, 218 (1886)
Wild Pitches: Tony Mullane, 53 (1886)
Hit Batsmen: Will White, 35 (1884)
Batters Faced: Will White, 2,367 (1883)

Career leaders (through 2013)

Batting
Batting Average: Cy Seymour, .332
On-base percentage: Joey Votto, .428
Slugging Percentage: Frank Robinson, .554
OPS: Joey Votto, .969
Games: Pete Rose, 2,722
At Bats: Pete Rose, 10,934
Runs: Pete Rose, 1,741
Hits: Pete Rose, 3,358
Total Bases: Pete Rose, 4,645
Doubles: Pete Rose, 601
Triples: Bid McPhee, 188
Home Runs: Johnny Bench, 389
Runs batted in: Johnny Bench, 1,376
Walks: Pete Rose, 1,210
Strikeouts: Tony Pérez, 1,306
Stolen Bases: Bid McPhee, 568
Singles: Pete Rose, 2,490
Runs Created: Pete Rose, 1,755
Extra-Base Hits: Pete Rose, 868
Times on Base: Pete Rose, 4,654
Hit By Pitch: Frank Robinson, 118
Sacrifice Hits: Edd Roush, 186
Sacrifice Flies: Johnny Bench, 90
Intentional Walks: Johnny Bench, 135
Grounded into Double Plays: Dave Concepción, 266
At Bats per Strikeout: Heinie Peitz, 178.5
At Bats per Home Run: Adam Dunn, 14.4
Outs: Pete Rose, 7,956

Pitching
Earned run average: Andy Coakley, 2.11
Wins: Eppa Rixey, 179
Won-Loss %: Don Gullett, .674
Walks and hits per inning pitched: Will White, 1.096
Hits Allowed/9IP: Mario Soto, 7.256
Walks/9IP: Red Lucas, 1.552
Strikeouts/9IP: Jim Maloney, 7.878
Games: Pedro Borbón, 531
Saves: Danny Graves, 182
Innings: Eppa Rixey, 2,890 ⅔
Strikeouts: Jim Maloney, 1,592
Games Started: Eppa Rixey, 357
Complete Games: Tony Mullane, 264
Shutouts: Bucky Walters, 32
Home Runs Allowed: Bronson Arroyo, 252
Walks Allowed: Johnny Vander Meer, 1,072
Hits Allowed: Eppa Rixey, 3,115
Strikeout to Walk: Aaron Harang, 3.187
Losses: Dolf Luque, 152
Earned Runs Allowed: Eppa Rixey, 1,068
Wild Pitches: Tony Mullane, 184
Hit Batsmen: Tony Mullane, 139
Batters Faced: Eppa Rixey, 12,127
Games Finished: Danny Graves, 337

See also
Baseball statistics

Records
Cincinnati Reds